Final Four was held on 19–20 March 2022. in Podgorica, Montenegro.

Semifinals

Third place

Final

Bracket

References

External links
Official website

Final Four